Tom Loftus (1917–2011; Irish: Tomás Ó Lochtuis) was a former chairman of the Leinster Provincial Council of the Gaelic Athletic Association (GAA).

Biography

Tom Loftus was born in Roscommon town, Co. Roscommon in 1917. His grandmother ran a dispensary and his father was a journalist with the Roscommon Herald. Loftus moved to Dublin in 1937 and married Ann Mooney in 1951. For most of his life he worked at the Electricity Supply Board (ESB) in the city.

Career
Loftus was chairman of the Leinster Council from 1972–1974, was chairman of the Dublin County Board and was a longstanding member of the organisation. He stood twice for the position of president of the GAA, but was twice pipped at the post, once by his namesake Dr. Mick Loftus.

During his period as Dublin Chairman, the team won the All-Ireland Senior Football Championship. In 1964, became the first chairman to bring his team to the United States, to raise awareness of the GAA in America.

In 1965, Loftus was a member of the first GAA committee to examine Rule 27, which prevented members from playing, attending or promoting other sports. The rule was originally passed in 1902 and was intended as a way of safeguarding the GAA from the influence of non-gaelic sports, but ultimately resulted in the untimely demise of several promising careers within the organisation. The rule read "Any member of the association who plays or encourages in any way rugby, football, hockey or any imported game which is calculated to injuriously affect our national pastimes, is suspended from the association." The first GAA committee failed to make any recommendations and it wasn't until 1971 that the ban was removed from the rulebooks.

Tom was also well known in Dublin for his weekly column in the Evening Press which he wrote throughout the 1960s and 70s.

Tom retired from his post in the ESB in 1977 and quickly became an advocate of junior level GAA, organising and coaching teams in Co. Wicklow, particularly Bray Emmets and Kilmacud Crokes.

After his retirement, Tom received numerous awards and recognitions of his contribution to the organisation. Until his death in 2011, he was the oldest living former chairman in the Gaelic Athletic Association

Successes
• 1963 Dublin won the All Ireland Football Final against Galway

Team: P. Flynn, L. Hickey, L. Foley, W. Casey, D. McKane, P. Holden, M. Kissane, D. Foley, John Timmons, B. McDonald, M. Whelan, G. Davey, S. Behan, D. Ferguson, N. Fox. Sub: P. Downey. 	

• 1965 Dublin won the Leinster Senior Football Championship against Longford

External links
Chairmen of the Leinster Council
Obituary at Bray People

Chairmanships

1917 births
2011 deaths
Chairmen of Gaelic games governing bodies 
Dublin County Board administrators
ESB people
Gaelic games administrators
Irish columnists
Leinster Provincial Council administrators